"Emergency" is a song by R&B singer Tank. It was written by Tank along with Robert Newt, J. Valentine, and Jerry "Texx" Franklin for his fourth album, Now or Never (2010), while production was helmed by duo Song Dynasty. The song was released as the album's second single and reached number four on the US Adult R&B Songs and number 23 on the Hot R&B/Hip-Hop Songs chart.

Track listing
Digital download
 "Emergency" – 4:13

Credits and personnel
Credits lifted from the liner notes of Now or Never.

Durrell "Tank" Babbs – writer
Danny Cheung – mastering engineer
Jerry "Texx" Franklin – writer
Jesus Garnica – mixing assistant

Jaycen Joshua – mixing engineer
Robert Newt – writer
Song Dynasty – producer
J. Valentine – writer

Charts

Weekly charts

Year-end charts

Release history

References

2010 singles
2010 songs
Tank (American singer) songs
Atlantic Records singles
Songs written by J. Valentine
Songs written by Tank (American singer)